Grant U. Fisher (August 25, 1865 – February 19, 1931) was a member of the Wisconsin State Assembly. He was elected to the Assembly in 1908 and 1910. Additionally, Fisher was assessor and town clerk of Center, Rock County, Wisconsin. He was a Republican.

Fisher was born on August 25, 1865. He died at his son's home in Whittier, California on February 19, 1931, and was buried at Bethel Cemetery in Center.

References

City and town clerks
1865 births
1931 deaths
People from Rock County, Wisconsin
Republican Party members of the Wisconsin State Assembly